Last Dance is a 1996 crime drama thriller film directed by Bruce Beresford and starring Sharon Stone, Rob Morrow, Randy Quaid and Peter Gallagher.

Plot
Cindy Liggett (Sharon Stone) is waiting on death row for a brutal double murder she committed in her teens, 12 years earlier. Clemency lawyer Rick Hayes (Rob Morrow) tries to save her, based on the argument that she was under the influence of crack cocaine when she committed the crime of which she was found guilty and that she is no longer the same person she had been at the time of the murder. However, her death sentence is carried out. The films ends with Rick on a trip to India after Cindy's execution.

Cast
 Sharon Stone as Cindy Liggett
 Rob Morrow as Rick Hayes
 Randy Quaid as Sam Burns
 Peter Gallagher as John Hayes
 Jack Thompson as The Governor
 Jayne Brook as Jill
 Pamala Tyson as Linda, Legal Aid Attorney
 Skeet Ulrich as Billy Liggett
 Don Harvey as Doug
 Diane Sellers as Inmate Reggie
 Patricia French as Guard Frances
 Ralph Wilcox as Warden Rice
 Buck Ford as District Attorney Rusk
 Dave Hager as Detective Vollo
 Christine Cattell as Louise
 Peg Allen as Helen
 Charles S. Dutton (uncredited) as John Henry Reese

Production
Last Dance was filmed in Nashville.

Critical reception
The film was largely ignored at the box office, and suffered in comparison to the 1995 film Dead Man Walking, which was an Academy Award-winning drama whose treatment of the death penalty theme was still fresh in the minds of audiences.

Last Dance received negative reviews from critics. It currently holds a 30% rating on Rotten Tomatoes based on 23 reviews, with an average rating of 5.2/10. Sharon Stone was nominated for a Razzie Award for Worst New Star (as the new serious Sharon Stone) for this film and Diabolique, where she lost to Pamela Anderson for Barb Wire.

Roger Ebert of the Chicago Sun-Times felt the film handled "potentially powerful material thoughtfully" and made a "good showcase for Stone". However, he pointed out that the film suffered from the "inescapable misfortune" of being following too soon after the "unquestioned masterpiece" of Dead Man Walking. In comparison, Ebert felt Last Dance "comes across as earnest but unoriginal". James Berardinelli of ReelViews also felt Dead Man Walking was "far superior". He felt Last Dance was a "less compelling tale" and "a little too safe", with "a little too much manipulation and melodrama". He praised Stone as giving the "most impressive performance of a rather lackluster career", but criticized Morrow as "leav[ing] something to be desired". He concluded that Last Dance is "perfectly watchable, and even worth a marginal recommendation, [but] in comparison to Dead Man Walking, it feels diluted."

Janet Maslin of the New York Times praised Stone's "stellar presence and surprisingly intense performance" in the film, describing her "dead-end role" as the film's "lifesaver". However, she was critical of the overall film, stating: "...soon the story begins taking sentimental turns, and even Ms. Stone's startling ferocity gets buried in sludge." Peter Travers of Rolling Stone was critical of the film and concluded: "Last Dance is a prison melodrama that embraces all the cliches that Dead Man Walking artfully dodged. Last Dance acts tough, but its heart is pure soap opera." Desson Howe of The Washington Post was also critical of the film, suggesting that the film "isn't quite "Dumb Blonde Walking", but that satirical slur isn't so far off the mark". He described the film as "formulaic" with a "strangely distancing" emotional effect.

Barbara Shulgasser of the San Francisco Chronicle described the film as "simplistic, puerile rubbish", adding that Stone needed to "start picking difficult material if she really wants to become an actress". Edward Guthmann of the same newspaper felt the film had "able" direction and acting, but that Dead Man Walking was "far superior". He praised Stone's performance, but added: "The moments when Last Dance doesn't gloss over Stone's character are the best, and they make you wish the movie had been restructured." He described the film as an "earnest, unremarkable addition to the Hollywood canon of prison movies". Anne Billson of the UK newspaper The Telegraph felt Stone "emerges from this enterprise with a certain amount of dignity", unlike Morrow, who is given "a wilfully unsympathetic role". She described the film as providing the "usual compendium of clichés".

References

External links
 
 
 
 

1996 films
American drama films
1996 drama films
Films about capital punishment
Films shot in South Carolina
Touchstone Pictures films
Films directed by Bruce Beresford
Films scored by Mark Isham
Women in prison films
Films produced by Steven Haft
Films with screenplays by Steven Haft
1990s English-language films
1990s American films